Pablo Arboine (born 3 April 1998) is a Costa Rican professional footballer who plays for Deportivo Saprissa. Besides Costa Rica, he has played in Norway and Denmark.

Career
Arboine made his debut for the senior Costa Rica national football team at the Avaya Stadium on the 2 February 2019 against the United States.

In August 2019, Arboine was loaned out from Sarpsborg 08 FF to Danish 1st Division club HB Køge. Having only played one game for the club, he left by the end of the year and immediately joined A.D. San Carlos on loan with an option to buy.

References

External links
 

1998 births
Living people
Costa Rican footballers
Costa Rican expatriate footballers
Costa Rica international footballers
Santos de Guápiles footballers
Sarpsborg 08 FF players
HB Køge players
A.D. San Carlos footballers
Liga FPD players
Association football defenders
Costa Rican expatriate sportspeople in Norway
Costa Rican expatriate sportspeople in Denmark
Expatriate footballers in Norway
Expatriate men's footballers in Denmark
People from Limón Province
Costa Rica youth international footballers